Cattleya tigrina is a bifoliate species of Cattleya orchid. The diploid chromosome number of C. tigrina has been determined as 2n = 40.

Hybrids
Cattleya × elegans is a hybrid orchid with a formula hybridae Cattleya purpurata (Lindl. & Paxton) Van den Berg (2008) × Cattleya tigrina A.Rich. (1848). It is found in South and South-East Brazil.

References

External links

tigrina
tigrina
Plants described in 1848